Samson & Delilah is the second studio album by English recording artist V V Brown, released on 9 September 2013 on Brown's YOY Records. Brown initially had planned to follow up her critically acclaimed debut album with Lollipops and Politics, promoting the release of the album with a debut single. The album was later shelved, in part due to do Brown's own wishes. She then went independent for Samson & Delilah, which found Brown experimenting with a radically different change in musical direction. Samson & Delilah is a concept album based around the biblical story of the same name. A short film using material from the album was used to promote the record.

Critical reception

Samson & Delilah received positive reviews from music critics. On Metacritic, the album received a score of 82 from professional sources, indicating "universal acclaim." Most all music critics noted the drastic change in direction that Brown took for the album. Upon announcing a free stream of the album prior to the album's release, Idolator wrote that the record was "one of the boldest 180s between an artist’s first and second albums that we’ve witnessed in a long time. We’re talking a Yeezus-level departure from an act’s established sonics. If Janelle Monáe is an android, V V Brown is now a T-1000." Ryan Lathan, writing for PopMatters, described the album as "skillfully produced" and "brave," one that "succeeds in forging a completely different identity for Brown," comparing the singer to Annie Lennox and Grace Jones.

Track listing

Charts

Release history

References

2013 albums
Albums produced by Pascal Gabriel
V V Brown albums